Rosa zaramagensis is a species of rose. Rosa zaramagensis is part of the genus Rosa, and the family Rosaceae Native to: North Caucasus, Transcaucasus.

References 

Plants described in 1963
zaramegnsis